The Feast of the Broken Heart is the third studio album by dance music group Hercules and Love Affair, released on May 26, 2014, by Moshi Moshi Records internationally and the following day in the United States by Big Beat Records and Atlantic Records.

Critical reception
AllMusic's Andy Kellman and The Guardian Lanre Bakare rated the album four out of five stars.

Rob LeDonne of T magazine called it "a subtle stylistic departure from Butler's earlier releases."

Track listing

Personnel
Credits adapted from the liner notes of The Feast of the Broken Heart.

 Gustaph – vocals ; additional keys 
 Rouge Mary – vocals 
 Krystle Warren – vocals 
 John Grant – vocals ; additional keys 
 Gus Hoffman – trombone 
 Andrew Butler – production
 Ha-Ze Factory – production, engineering, mixing
 Mark Pistel – production 
 Benjamin Alexander Huseby – photography (group shot)
 Alexander Nussbaumer – portraits, design
 Marianne Vlaschits – artwork

Charts

References

External links
 
 

2014 albums
Big Beat Records (American record label) albums
Hercules and Love Affair albums
Moshi Moshi Records albums